Vanča Vas (Prekmurje Slovene: Vanča Ves) is a village in the Municipality of Tišina in the Prekmurje region of northeastern Slovenia.

The writer Antal Stevanecz was born in Vanča Vas.

References

External links
Vanča Vas on Geopedia

Populated places in the Municipality of Tišina